The anthophytes are a paraphyletic grouping of plant taxa bearing flower-like reproductive structures. The group, once thought to be a clade, contained the angiosperms - the extant flowering plants, such as roses and grasses - as well as the Gnetales and the extinct Bennettitales.

Detailed morphological and molecular studies have shown that the group is not actually monophyletic, with proposed floral homologies of the gnetophytes and the angiosperms having evolved in parallel.  This makes it easier to reconcile molecular clock data that suggests that the angiosperms diverged from the gymnosperms around 320-300 mya.

Some more recent studies have used the word anthophyte to describe a group which includes the angiosperms and a variety of fossils (glossopterids, Pentoxylon, Bennettitales, and Caytonia), but not the Gnetales.

References

Historically recognized plant taxa